On 6 January 2019, a new Lebanese government was formed, headed by Prime Minister Saad Hariri. The government took nine months to form, following extended negotiations with various political factions. It is a national unity cabinet, and is composed of 30 ministers.

The government was forced to resign on 27 October 2019 following mass protests. It was replaced by the January 2020 government led by Hassan Diab.

Composition

References

2019 establishments in Lebanon
Cabinets established in 2019
Cabinets of Lebanon
Cabinets disestablished in 2019
2019 disestablishments in Lebanon
Michel Aoun